Harry Geffert (1934 – November 10, 2017) was an American bronze sculptor.

Life
Geffert was born in 1934, in Live Oak County, Texas. He graduated with a bachelor of science degree from Southwest Texas State University (later known as Texas State University), and he earned a master's degree from New Mexico Highlands University.

Geffert was a professor of Sculpture at Texas Christian University for nearly three decades. In the 1980s, he opened a studio in Crowley, Texas, where he made bronze sculptures. He exhibited his sculptures at the Dallas Museum of Art in 1990-1991.

Geffert died on November 10, 2017 in Crowley, Texas. His artwork can be seen at the Dallas Museum of Art, the Museum of Fine Arts, Houston, the Modern Art Museum of Fort Worth, and the El Paso Museum of Art.

Further reading

References

1934 births
2017 deaths
People from Crowley, Texas
Texas State University alumni
New Mexico Highlands University alumni
Texas Christian University faculty
Sculptors from Texas
American male sculptors
20th-century American sculptors
20th-century American male artists